Acrotatus can refer to one of two related people in ancient Greek history:

Acrotatus I, the son of Spartan king Cleomenes II
Acrotatus II, grandson of the above. Succeeded Areus I as king of Sparta